The Mooncraft Special MCS 8, also known simply as the MCS 8, was a Japanese sports prototype race car, used in the Fuji Grand Champion Series, between 1988 and 1989. Based on both the Lola T87/50, and later Lola T88/50 Formula 3000 cars, it was powered by a  Mugen MF308 V8 engine, and ran on either Bridgestone or Dunlop tires.

References 

Sports prototypes
Sports racing cars